St. Andrew's Church is an historic Episcopal church complex in Richmond, Virginia, United States.  The complex consists of the church (1901), school (1901), parish hall (1904), Instructive Nurse Association Building (1904), and William Byrd Community House or Arents Free Library (1908). The church is a rough-faced Virginia granite, cruciform Gothic Revival style structure dominated by a 115-foot corner tower.  The school and parish hall are three-story, brick buildings on a stone basements.

The woodwork for the structures was provided by Richmond Wood Working Company. A.H. Ellwood and Noland & Baskerville are credited as the architects. The Gothic Revival architecture site was added to the National Register of Historic Places in 1979.

See also
William Byrd Community House
Grace Arents

References

20th-century Episcopal church buildings
Churches in Richmond, Virginia
Episcopal churches in Virginia
Gothic Revival church buildings in Virginia
National Register of Historic Places in Richmond, Virginia
Churches on the National Register of Historic Places in Virginia
Churches completed in 1901